Oliver Anketell  was an 18th-century Irish politician.

Anketell was born in Dungannon in 1679 and educated at Trinity College, Dublin. From 1753 to 1760, he was MP for Monaghan Borough.

References

Alumni of Trinity College Dublin
Irish MPs 1727–1760
Members of the Parliament of Ireland (pre-1801) for County Monaghan constituencies
People from Dungannon
1679 births